The Cinema Eye Honors are awards recognizing excellence in nonfiction or documentary filmmaking and include awards for the disciplines of directing, producing, cinematography and editing. The awards are presented each January in New York and have been held since 2011 at the Museum of the Moving Image in Astoria, Queens. Cinema Eye was created to celebrate artistic craft in nonfiction filmmaking, addressing a perceived imbalance in the field where awards were given for social impact or importance of topic rather than artistic excellence.

History
Nominations for the awards are determined by voting of top film festival documentary programmers and winners are voted on by an invited membership of more than 800 documentary film experts. Cinema Eye also presents an Audience Choice Prize where voting is open to the public and the Heterodox Award.

The first Cinema Eye Honors were presented at the IFC Center in New York City on March 18, 2008.

Winners Through the Years

Winners in 2008 
Outstanding Achievement in Nonfiction Feature Filmmaking - Manda Bala (Send a Bullet) - Dir. Jason Kohn; Prods. Joey Frank, Jared Goldman, Jason Kohn
Outstanding Achievement in Direction - Taxi to the Dark Side - Alex Gibney
Outstanding Achievement in Production - Ghosts of Cité Soleil - Seth Kanegis, Tomas Radoor, Mikael Rieks
Outstanding Achievement in Cinematography - Manda Bala (Send a Bullet) - Heloísa Passos
Outstanding Achievement in Editing - Manda Bala (Send a Bullet) - Doug Abel, Jenny Golden, Andy Grieve
Outstanding Achievement in Graphic Design and Animation - Chicago 10 - Animation by Curious Pictures
Outstanding Achievement in a Debut Feature Film - Billy the Kid - Jennifer Venditti
Outstanding Achievement in an International Feature Film - The Monastery: Mr. Vig and the Nun - Dir. Pernille Rose Grønkjær; Prod. Sigrid Dyekjær
Audience Choice Prize - The King of Kong: A Fistful of Quarters - Dir. Seth Gordon

Winners in 2009
Outstanding Achievement in Nonfiction Feature Filmmaking - Man on Wire - Dir. James Marsh, Prod. Simon Chinn
Outstanding Achievement in Direction - Waltz with Bashir - Ari Folman
Outstanding Achievement in Production - Man on Wire - Simon Chinn
Outstanding Achievement in Cinematography - Encounters at the End of the World - Peter Zeitlinger
Outstanding Achievement in Editing - Man on Wire - Jinx Godfrey
Outstanding Achievement in Graphic Design and Animation - Waltz with Bashir - Yoni Goodman, David Polonsky
Outstanding Achievement in Music Composition - Waltz with Bashir - Max Richter
Outstanding Achievement in a Debut Feature Film - Up the Yangtze - Dir. Yung Chang
Outstanding Achievement in an International Feature Film - Waltz with Bashir - Dir. Ari Folman; Prod. Ari Folman, Serge Lalou, Gerhard Meixner, Yael Nahlieli, Roman Paul
Honored Shorts - Breadmakers, City of Cranes, Kids + money, One Day, The Tailor
Audience Choice Prize - Up the Yangtze - Dir. Yung Chang

Winners in 2010
Outstanding Achievement in Nonfiction Feature Filmmaking - The Cove - Dir. Louie Psihoyos; Prod. Paula DuPré Pesman, Fisher Stevens
Outstanding Achievement in Direction - The Beaches of Agnès - Agnès Varda
Outstanding Achievement in Production - The Cove - Paula DuPré Pesman, Fisher Stevens
Outstanding Achievement in Cinematography - The Cove - Brook Aitken
Outstanding Achievement in Editing - Burma VJ - Janus Billeskov-Jansen, Thomas Papapetros
Outstanding Achievement in Graphic Design and Animation
Food, Inc. - Bigstar
RiP!: A Remix Manifesto - Francis Hanneman, Darren Pasemko, Kent Hugo, Omar Majeed, Brett Gaylor, Open Source Cinema
Outstanding Achievement in Original Music Score - October Country - Danny Grody, Donal Mosher, Michael Palmieri, Ted Savarese, Kenric Taylor
Outstanding Achievement in a Debut Feature Film - October Country - Dir. Michael Palmieri, Donal Mosher
Outstanding Achievement in an International Feature Film - Burma VJ - Dir. Anders Østergaard; Prod. Lise Lense-Møller
Spotlight Award - Beetle Queen Conquers Tokyo - Dir. Jessica Oreck
Audience Choice Prize - The September Issue - Dir. R. J. Cutler
2010 Legacy Award - Sherman's March - Dir. Ross McElwee

Winners in 2011
Outstanding Achievement in Nonfiction Feature Filmmaking - Exit Through the Gift Shop - Dir. Banksy; Prod. Jaimie D’Cruz
Outstanding Achievement in Direction - The Oath - Laura Poitras
Outstanding Achievement in Production - Last Train Home - Mila Aung-Thwin, Daniel Cross
Outstanding Achievement in Cinematography - Last Train Home - Lixin Fan
Outstanding Achievement in Editing - Exit Through the Gift Shop - Chris King, Tom Fulford
Outstanding Achievement in Graphic Design and Animation - Gasland - Juan Cardarelli, Alex Tyson
Outstanding Achievement in Original Music Score - The Sound of Insects: Record of a Mummy - Norbert Möslang
Outstanding Achievement in a Debut Feature Film - Marwencol - Dir. Jeff Malmberg
Outstanding Achievement in an International Feature Film - Last Train Home - Dir. Lixin Fan; Prod. Mila Aung-Thwin, Daniel Cross
Spotlight Award - The Autobiography of Nicolae Ceauşescu - Dir. Andrei Ujică
Audience Choice Prize - Joan Rivers: A Piece of Work - Dir. Ricki Stern, Annie Sundberg
Heterodox Award - Putty Hill - Dir. Matt Porterfield
Outstanding Achievement in Nonfiction Short Filmmaking - The Poodle Trainer - Dir. Vance Malone
2011 Legacy Award - Grey Gardens - Albert Maysles, David Maysles, Ellen Hovde, Muffie Meyer and Susan Froemke

Winners in 2012

Outstanding Achievement in Nonfiction Feature Filmmaking - The Interrupters - Dir. Steve James; Prod. Steve James and Alex Kotlowitz
Outstanding Achievement in Direction - The Interrupters - Steve James
Outstanding Achievement in Production - Pina - Gian-Piero Ringel, Wim Wenders
Outstanding Achievement in Cinematography - "Hell and Back Again" - Danfung Dennis
Outstanding Achievement in Editing - Senna - Gregers Sall, Chris King
Outstanding Achievement in Graphic Design and Animation - Tabloid - Rob Feng, Jeremy Landman
Outstanding Achievement in Original Music Score - Tabloid - John Kusiak
Outstanding Achievement in a Debut Feature Film - The Arbor - Dir. Clio Barnard
Spotlight Award - El Lugar Más Pequeño (The Tiniest Place) - Dir. Tatiana Huezo Sanchez
Audience Choice Prize - Buck - Dir. Cindy Meehl
Heterodox Award - Beginners - Dir. Mike Mills
Outstanding Achievement in Nonfiction Short Filmmaking - "Diary" - Tim Hetherington
Hell Yeah Prize - Paradise Lost Trilogy - Dir. Joe Berlinger, Bruce Sinofsky
2012 Legacy Award - Titicut Follies - Frederick Wiseman

Winners in 2013 

 Outstanding Achievement in Nonfiction Feature Filmmaking - 5 Broken Cameras  - Dir. Emad Burnat and Guy Davidi; Prod. Christine Camdessus, Serge Gordey, Emad Burnat and Guy Davidi
 Outstanding Achievement in Direction - Detropia - Heidi Ewing and Rachel Grady
 Outstanding Achievement in Production - The Imposter - Dimitri Doganis
 Outstanding Achievement in Cinematography - Chasing Ice - Jeff Orlowski
 Outstanding Achievement in Editing - How to Survive a Plague - T. Woody Richman and Tyler H. Walk
 Outstanding Achievement in Graphic Design and Animation - Searching for Sugar Man - Oskar Gullstrand and Arvid Steen
 Outstanding Achievement in Original Music Score - Detropia - Dial.81
 Outstanding Achievement in a Debut Feature Film - Only The Young - Jason Tippet and Elizabeth Mims
 Spotlight Award - Argentinian Lesson - Wojciech Staroń
 Audience Choice Prize - Bully - Lee Hirsch
 Heterodox Award - Museum Hours - Jem Cohen
 Outstanding Achievement in Nonfiction Short Filmmaking - Good Bye Mandima (Kwa Heri Mandima) - Robert-Jan Lacombe
 2013 Legacy Award - The War Room - Chris Hegedus and D.A. Pennebaker

Winners in 2014 

 Outstanding Achievement in Nonfiction Feature Filmmaking - The Act of Killing - Dir. Joshua Oppenheimer; Prod. Signe Byrge Sørensen

 Outstanding Achievement in Direction - Stories We Tell - Sarah Polley
 Outstanding Achievement in Production - The Act of Killing - Signe Byrge Sørensen
 Outstanding Achievement in Cinematography - Leviathan - Lucien Castaing-Taylor and Véréna Paravel
 Outstanding Achievement in Editing - Let the Fire Burn - Nels Bangerter
 Outstanding Achievement in Graphic Design and Animation - Cutie and the Boxer - Noriko Shinohara and Art Jail
 Outstanding Achievement in Original Music Score - Cutie and the Boxer - Yasuaki Shimizu
 Outstanding Achievement in a Debut Feature Film - Cutie and the Boxer - Zachary Heinzerling
 Spotlight Award - "The Last Station" - Cristian Soto and Catalina Vergara
 Audience Choice Prize - Sound City - Dave Grohl
 Heterodox Award - "Post Tenebras Lux" - Carlos Reygadas
 Outstanding Achievement in Nonfiction Short Filmmaking - A Story for Modlins - Sergio Oksman
 Outstanding Achievement in Nonfiction Films Made for Television - The Crash Reel - Dir. Lucy Walker; Prod. Julian Cautherley and Lucy Walker
 2014 Legacy Award - Harlan County, USA - Barbara Kopple
 Hell Yeah Prize - Gasland - Josh Fox

Winners in 2015 

 Outstanding Achievement in Nonfiction Feature Filmmaking - Citizenfour - Dir. Laura Poitras; Prod. Laura Poitras, Mathilde Bonnefoy and Dirk Wilutzky
 Outstanding Achievement in Direction - Citizenfour - Laura Poitras
 Outstanding Achievement in Production - Citizenfour - Laura Poitras, Mathilde Bonnefoy and Dirk Wilutzky
 Outstanding Achievement in Cinematography
20,000 Days on Earth - Erik Wilson
Virunga - Franklin Dow and Orlando von Einsiedel
 Outstanding Achievement in Editing - Citizenfour - Mathilde Bonnefoy
 Outstanding Achievement in Graphic Design and Animation - Jodorowsky's Dune - Syd Garon and Particle Fever - MK12
 Outstanding Achievement in Original Music Score - 20,000 Days on Earth - Nick Cave and Warren Ellis
 Outstanding Achievement in a Debut Feature Film - Finding Vivian Maier - John Maloof and Charlie Siskel
 Spotlight Award - 1971 - Johanna Hamilton
 Heterodox Award - Boyhood - Richard Linklater
 Audience Choice - Keep On Keepin' On - Alan Hicks
 Outstanding Achievement in Nonfiction Short Filmmaking - The Lion's Mouth Opens - Lucy Walker
 Outstanding Achievement in Nonfiction Films Made for Television - The Price of Gold - Dir. Nanette Burstein; Prod. Libby Geist
 2015 Legacy Award - Paris is Burning - Jennie Livingston

Winners in 2016 

 Outstanding Achievement in Nonfiction Feature Filmmaking - The Look of Silence - Dir. Joshua Oppenheimer; Prod. Signe Byrge Sørensen
 Outstanding Achievement in Direction - The Look of Silence - Joshua Oppenheimer
 Outstanding Achievement in Production - The Look of Silence - Signe Byrge Sørensen
 Outstanding Achievement in Cinematography
Cartel Land - Matthew Heineman and Matt Porwoll
Meru - Jimmy Chin and Renan Ozturk
 Outstanding Achievement in Editing - Amy - Chris King
 Outstanding Achievement in Graphic Design and Animation - Kurt Cobain: Montage of Heck - Stefan Nadelman and Hisko Hulsing
 Outstanding Achievement in Original Music Score - The Heart of a Dog - Laurie Anderson
 Outstanding Achievement in a Debut Feature Film - The Wolfpack - Crystal Moselle
 Spotlight Award - Toto and His Sisters - Alexandre Nanău
 Heterodox Award - Taxi - Jafar Panahi
 Audience Choice - Meru - Jimmy Chin and Chai Vasarhelyi
 Outstanding Achievement in Nonfiction Short Filmmaking
Buffalo Juggalos - Scott Cummings
Hotel 22 - Elizabeth Lo
 Outstanding Achievement in Nonfiction Films Made for Television - Private Violence - Dir. Cynthia Hill; Prod. Cynthia Hill
 2016 Legacy Award - American Movie - Chris Smith

Winners in 2017 

 Outstanding Achievement in Nonfiction Feature Filmmaking - Cameraperson - Dir. Kirsten Johnson; Prod. Kirsten Johnson and Marilyn Ness
 Outstanding Achievement in Direction - OJ: Made in America - Ezra Edelman
 Outstanding Achievement in Production -  OJ: Made in America - Ezra Edelman and Caroline Waterlow
 Outstanding Achievement in Cinematography - Cameraperson - Kirsten Johnson
 Outstanding Achievement in Editing - Cameraperson - Nels Bangerter
 Outstanding Achievement in Graphic Design and Animation - Tower - Craig Staggs and Keith Maitland
 Outstanding Achievement in Original Music Score - Contemporary Colors - David Byrne, LeeAnn Rossi and Aaron Rosenblum
 Outstanding Achievement in a Debut Feature Film - Hooligan Sparrow - Nanfu Wang
 Spotlight Award - Les Sauteurs (Those Who Jump) - Estephan Wagner and Moritz Siebert
 Heterodox Award - All These Sleepless Nights - Michal Marczak
 Audience Choice - Gleason - Clay Tweel
 Outstanding Achievement in Nonfiction Short Filmmaking - La Laguna - Aaron Schock
 Outstanding Achievement in Nonfiction Films Made for Television - Making a Murderer - Dir. Laura Ricciardi and Moira Demos; Prod. Laura Ricciardi and Moira Demos
 2017 Legacy Award - The Times of Harvey Milk - Rob Epstein

Winners in 2018 

 Outstanding Achievement in Nonfiction Feature Filmmaking - Strong Island - Dir. Yance Ford; Prod. Joslyn Barnes and Yance Ford
 Outstanding Achievement in Direction - Strong Island - Yance Ford
 Outstanding Achievement in Production - Last Men in Aleppo - Kareem Abeed, Stefan Kloos, and Søren Steen Jespersen
 Outstanding Achievement in Cinematography - Chasing Coral - Andrew Ackerman and Jeff Orlowski
 Outstanding Achievement in Editing - Quest - Lindsay Utz
 Outstanding Achievement in Graphic Design and Animation - Long Strange Trip - Stefan Nadelman
 Outstanding Achievement in Original Music Score - Jane - Philip Glass
 Outstanding Achievement in a Debut Feature Film - Strong Island- Yance Ford
 Outstanding Achievement in Broadcast Nonfiction Filmmaking - The Keepers - Dir. Ryan White; Prod. Jessica Hargrave
 Spotlight Award - Lots of Kids, a Monkey and a Castle - Gustavo Salmerón
 Heterodox Award - The Florida Project - Sean Baker
 Audience Choice - Jane - Brett Morgen
 Outstanding Achievement in Nonfiction Short Filmmaking - The Rabbit Hunt - Patrick Bresnan
 2018 Legacy Award - When We Were Kings - Leon Gast
 Hell Yeah Prize - Icarus - Bryan Fogel

Winners in 2019 

 Outstanding Achievement in Nonfiction Feature Filmmaking - Hale County This Morning, This Evening - Dir. RaMell Ross; Prod. Joslyn Barnes, Su Kim, and RaMell Ross
 Outstanding Achievement in Direction - Minding the Gap - Bing Liu
 Outstanding Achievement in Production - Free Solo - Elizabeth Chai Vasarhelyi, Jimmy Chin, Evan Hayes and Shannon Dill
 Outstanding Achievement in Cinematography - Free Solo - Jimmy Chin, Clair Popkin and Mikey Schaeffer
 Outstanding Achievement in Editing - Minding the Gap - Bing Liu and Joshua Altman
 Outstanding Achievement in Graphic Design and Animation - Shirkers - Lucas Celler and Sandi Tan
 Outstanding Achievement in Original Music Score - Shirkers - Ishai Adar
 Outstanding Achievement in a Debut Feature Film - Minding the Gap - Bing Liu
 Outstanding Achievement in a Nonfiction Film for Broadcast - Baltimore Rising - Sonja Sohn
 Outstanding Achievement in a Nonfiction Series for Broadcast - America to Me - Steve James
 Spotlight Award - The Distant Barking of Dogs - Simon Lereng Wilmont
 Heterodox Award - American Animals - Bart Layton
 Audience Choice - Free Solo - Elizabeth Chai Vasarhelyi, Jimmy Chin
 Outstanding Achievement in Nonfiction Short Filmmaking - My Dead Dad's Porno Tapes - Charlie Tyrell
 2019 Legacy Award - Eyes on the Prize - Harry Hampton, Orlando Bagwell, Sheila Curran Bernard, Callie Crossley, James A. DeVinney, Madison D. Lacy, Thomas Ott, Samuel D. Pollard, Terry Kay Rockefeller, Jacqueline Shearer, Paul Stekler, Judith Vecchione

Winners in 2020 

 Outstanding Achievement in Nonfiction Feature Filmmaking - American Factory - Dir. Steve Bognar and Julia Reichert; Prod. Steve Bognar, Julia Reichert, Jeff Reichert and Julie Parker Benello
 Outstanding Achievement in Direction - American Factory - Steve Bognar and Julia Reichert
 Outstanding Achievement in Production
For Sama - Waad al-Kateab
The Cave - Kirstine Barford and Sigrid Dyekjær
 Outstanding Achievement in Cinematography - Honeyland - Fejmi Daut and Samir Ljuma
 Outstanding Achievement in Editing - Apollo 11 - Todd Douglas Miller
 Outstanding Achievement in Graphic Design and Animation - The Great Hack - Patrick Cederberg, Matthew Hornick and Ash Thorp
 Outstanding Achievement in Original Music Score - Apollo 11 - Matt Morton
 Outstanding Achievement in a Debut Feature Film - The Disappearance of My Mother - Beniamino Barrese
 Outstanding Achievement in a Nonfiction Film for Broadcast - Leaving Neverland - Dan Reed
 Outstanding Achievement in a Nonfiction Series for Broadcast - Tricky Dick - Mary Robertson
 Outstanding Achievement in Broadcast Cinematography - Homecoming - Mark Ritchie, Julian Klincewicz, Dikayl Rimmasch and Irie Calkins
 Outstanding Achievement in Broadcast Editing - Apollo: Missions to the Moon - David Tillman
 Spotlight Award - Present Award - Shengze Zhu
 Heterodox Award - The Souvenir - Joanna Hogg
 Audience Choice - The Biggest Little Farm - John Chester
 Outstanding Achievement in Nonfiction Short Filmmaking - Ghosts of Sugar Land - Bassam Tariq
 2020 Legacy Award - Koyaanisqatsi - Godfrey Reggio

Winners in 2021

Winners in 2022

References

Further reading
The First-Ever Cinema Eye Honors. at IFC.com
"Gift Shop" and "The Oath" Win Top Cinema Eye Honors for Nonfiction at indiewire.com
Banksy Takes the Top Prize at the Cinema Eye Documentary Honors at ifc.com
The New Breed: Manda Bala Takes 3 in Cinema Eye's inaugural documentary awards at imdb.com
"Wire, "Bashir" Top Cinema Eye Doc Awards at indiewire.com
Cinema Eye Honors 'Manda Bala', 'Billy the Kid' and 'The King of Kong', Among Others at thedocumentaryblog.com
"The Cove" Leads Cinema Eye Honors Nominees at indiewire.com
'The Interrupters' Takes Top Two Prizes at Cinema Eye Honors 2012 at pbs.org
'The Interrupters' Takes Top Prizes at Cinema Eye Honors at reuters.com

External links 
All About The Cinema Eye Awards for Documentaries at About.com

American film awards
Awards established in 2008